The 1938 Ice Hockey World Championships were held between February 11 and February 20, 1938, at Štvanice Stadium in Prague, Czechoslovakia.  It marked the 30th anniversary of the IIHF, and a special celebration was held with famous hockey players from all over Europe in attendance. Also a yearbook was produced for the twenty-two member nations which documented which European country had the most hockey clubs (Czechoslovakia 361) and the most artificial rinks (Great Britain 21).

Fourteen teams participated in this World Championship. It was first divided into three preliminary round groups — two groups of five and a group with four teams. In the preliminary round, the top three teams in each group advanced to the second round. The nine teams advancing to the second round were divided into three groups of three teams each. The three group winners and the best second-place team advanced to the semifinals.

The Canadians won the World Championship title for the tenth time beating Great Britain 3-1 in the final, leaving the British with their fourth European Championship title (the third in a row). In the bronze-medal game, Czechoslovakia defeated Germany 3-0, and in a match for fifth place Sweden defeated Switzerland 2-0. The Swiss were very unhappy with the IIHF's decision to pick Germany as the fourth semi-finalist, as the two of them, and Sweden, finished the second round in an absolute tie. The decision was made to advance Germany because they had lost to Canada, so they were the best European nation in their group.

World Men's Hockey Championships (in Prague, Czechoslovakia)

First round

Group A 

Standings - Group A

Group B 

Standings - Group B

Group C 

Standings - Group C

Second round

Group A 

Standings - Group A

Group B 

Standings - Group B

Group C 

Standings—Group C

+ Germany, Switzerland and Sweden ended with identical records. The Organizing Committee awarded the semifinal position to Germany because it had to play Canada.

Consolation round 5–6 place

Final round

Final Rankings – World Championships 

World Champion 1938

Members of team
Sudbury Wolves

Final Rankings – European Championships 

European Champion 1938

Citations

References
Complete results

IIHF Men's World Ice Hockey Championships
International ice hockey competitions hosted by Czechoslovakia
1937–38 in Czechoslovak ice hockey
February 1938 sports events
Sports competitions in Prague
1930s in Prague